The Last Town Chorus is the debut album by The Last Town Chorus.

Track listing

Credits

The Last Town Chorus is Megan Hickey, lapsteel and voice and Nat Guy, acoustic guitar

Recorded in Brooklyn, NY in the Summer and Autumn of 2002 by Greg Hoy
House of Maggots Mobile Audio. Mastered by Gene Paul of DB Plus Audio, NY, NY.

Joe McGinty, organ on Brooklyn Navy Yard, 1950, Oregon and State Fair
Tim Kiah, upright bass on Brooklyn Navy Yard, 1950, The Ground and Little Star
Greg Hoy, organ on Dear City and Try (Megan, guitar)

The Last Town Chorus albums
2002 debut albums